The United Nations Educational, Scientific and Cultural Organization (UNESCO) World Heritage Sites are places of importance to cultural or natural heritage as described in the UNESCO World Heritage Convention, established in 1972. Kenya accepted the convention, making its historical sites eligible for inclusion on the list. As of 2018, there are seven World Heritage Sites in Kenya.

World Heritage Sites

Site – named after the World Heritage Committee's official designation
Location – sorted by country, followed by the region at the regional or provincial level. In the case of multinational or multi-regional sites, the names are sorted alphabetically.
Criteria – as defined by the World Heritage Committee
Area – in hectares and acres, excluding any buffer zones. A value of zero implies that no data has been published by UNESCO
Year – during which the site was inscribed to the World Heritage List
Description – brief information about the site, including reasons for qualifying as an endangered site, if applicable

See also
List of World Heritage Sites in Africa

External links
unesco.org

References

 
Kenya
Kenya geography-related lists
Lists of tourist attractions in Kenya